Remartinia is a genus of darners in the dragonfly family Aeshnidae. There are at least four described species in Remartinia.

Species
These four species belong to the genus Remartinia:
 Remartinia luteipennis (Burmeister, 1839) (malachite darner)
 Remartinia restricta Carvalho, 1992
 Remartinia rufipennis (Kennedy, 1941)
 Remartinia secreta (Calvert, 1952)

References

Further reading

 
 
 
 

Aeshnidae
Articles created by Qbugbot